The Army of Georgia was a Union army that constituted the Left Wing of Major General William T. Sherman's Army Group during the  March to the Sea and the Carolinas Campaign.

History
During Sherman's Atlanta Campaign in 1864, his Army Group was composed of the Army of the Tennessee, the Army of the Cumberland, and the Army of the Ohio.  After the fall of  Atlanta in September, Sherman sent the Army of the Ohio and the  IV Corps of the Army of the Cumberland north to deal with the remnants of Lt. Gen. John Bell Hood's  Army of Tennessee.  Then, in November, he created the Army of Georgia, by combining the remaining  XIV Corps and the  XX Corps of the Army of the Cumberland. This new army, placed under the command of Maj. Gen. Henry Warner Slocum of the XX Corps, served as one of the two wings in Sherman's March to the Sea. The Army of the Tennessee, consisting of the  XV and  XVII Corps, commanded by Oliver O. Howard, served as the other wing. The Army of Georgia was involved in little fighting during the March to the Sea but was engaged in the Battle of Averasborough and bore the brunt of fighting at the Battle of Bentonville.

Commander
 Major General Henry Warner Slocum  (November, 1864 – April, 1865)

Major Battles and Campaigns
 Atlanta Campaign
 Sherman's March to the Sea
 Carolinas Campaign
 Battle of Averasborough
 Battle of Bentonville
 Grand Review of the Armies

References
Army of Georgia at the American Civil War.

External links
Army of Georgia Historical Society	

Georgia, Army of
Georgia (U.S. state) in the American Civil War
South Carolina in the American Civil War
North Carolina in the American Civil War
1864 establishments in Georgia (U.S. state)